Gerald Harper (born 15 February 1931) is an English actor, best known for his work on television, having played the title roles in Adam Adamant Lives! (1966–67) and Hadleigh (1969–76). He then returned to his main love, the theatre. His classical work includes playing on Broadway with the Old Vic company, playing Iago at the Bristol Old Vic and Benedick at the Chichester Festival Theatre. Other plays in London included Crucifer of Blood at the Haymarket Theatre, House Guest, A Personal Affair, Suddenly at Home and Baggage. He has directed many plays, amongst them a production of Blithe Spirit in Hebrew at the Israeli National Theatre.

Early life 
Harper was born in London, and originally wanted to be a doctor, but became interested in acting while still at school. He was educated at Haileybury. After two years of national service in the British Army, he decided to abandon his medicine course at Cambridge University and successfully auditioned for RADA. He started in the London Arts Theatre followed by Liverpool Playhouse, before returning to London to perform in Charley's Aunt with Frankie Howerd.

Acting career 
Harper's film credits include The Admirable Crichton (1957), A Night to Remember (1958), The League of Gentlemen (1960), Tunes of Glory (1960), The Young Ones (1961), The Punch and Judy Man (1963), The Shoes of the Fisherman (1968) and The Lady Vanishes (1979).  Television work included The Sleeper, The Corsican Brothers and Gazette.

Harper presented The Sunday Affair for Capital Radio in the 1970s, and a series of Saturday afternoon shows for BBC Radio 2 in the early 1990s, in which he played classic songs from the past and gave away bottles of champagne and chocolates. His opening phrase, usually spoken over the introduction of the first song, was "Hello....I'm Gerald Harper. Welcome to my Saturday selection". The radio show was resurrected for Talksport between 2002 and 2003, and re-titled Champagne and Roses.

He also had roles in Free as Air and Ross and toured in America with the Old Vic and Boeing-Boeing. He toured the country in 2008 as the lead in Agatha Christie's And Then There Were None directed by Joe Harmston for producer Bill Kenwright. He also played one of the barristers in The Baccarat Scandal at Chichester Festival Theatre which starred Keith Michell.

Personal life 
Harper was married to the actress Jane Downs. He later entered a relationship with actress Sarah Alexander.

Selected filmography

 The Dam Busters (1955) – Mocking RAF Officer (uncredited)
 Tiger in the Smoke (1956) – Duds Morrison
 Stars in Your Eyes (1956) – Dicky
 The Extra Day (1956) – Police Constable
 The Admirable Crichton (1957) – Ernest
 A Night to Remember (1958) –  3rd Officer, SS Carpathia
 The League of Gentlemen (1960) – Captain Saunders
 Tunes of Glory (1960) – Major Hugo Macmillan
 The Young Ones (1961) – Watts
 The Punch and Judy Man (1963) – 1st Drunk
 Wonderful Life (1964) – Sheik / Scotsman / Harold
 Strangler's Web (Edgar Wallace Mysteries) (1965) – Inspector Murray
 Up Jumped a Swagman (1965) – Publicity Man
 The Shoes of the Fisherman (1968) – Brian
 The Lady Vanishes (1979) – Todhunter

References

External links
 
 
 

1931 births
Living people
20th-century British Army personnel
Alumni of the University of Cambridge
Alumni of RADA
English male film actors
English male stage actors
English male television actors
Male actors from London
People educated at Haileybury and Imperial Service College